Countess Therese [von] Brunsvik (in Hungarian Teréz Brunszvik, sometimes referred to in English as Therese Countess von Brunsvik or Brunswick) (July 27, 1775, Pozsony, Kingdom of Hungary – September 23, 1861, Pest, Kingdom of Hungary) was a member of the Hungarian nobility, pedagoge and a follower of the Swiss Pestalozzi. Her father was the Hungarian count Antal Brunszvik and her mother was the baroness Anna Seeberg; her siblings were Franz, Josephine, and Charlotte.

She was the founder of nursery schools in Hungary on July 1, 1828, after Robert Owen's example set in New Lanark, Scotland in 1816. Soon the pre-school institution became famous all over Hungary and in 1837, Friedrich Fröbel founded the first "kindergarten" in Germany.

One of Ludwig van Beethoven's students, Therese was the dedicatee for his Piano Sonata No. 24 (in F major, Opus 78), and some writers speculated that she—not her sister Josephine who is generally accepted as the addressee—may have been the intended recipient of Beethoven's letter to the "Immortal Beloved". Her memoirs were first published by La Mara, who subscribed to this theory. and her diaries and notes (up to 1813) by Marianne Czeke, both claiming to reveal much about the relations between Beethoven and the Brunsvik family, in particular her sister Josephine.

References

External links 
  http://www.mek.iif.hu/porta/szint/egyeb/lexikon/eletrajz/html/ABC00523/02357.htm
  http://www.aeiou.at/aeiou.encyclop.b/b830508.htm

18th-century Hungarian people
19th-century Hungarian people
19th-century Hungarian educators
Hungarian-German people
Terez
People from Bratislava
1775 births
1861 deaths
Pupils of Ludwig van Beethoven